László Gindl is a Hungarian sprint canoer who competed in the late 1980s. He won a gold medal in the K-2 10000 m event at the 1986 ICF Canoe Sprint World Championships in Montreal.

References

Hungarian male canoeists
Living people
Year of birth missing (living people)
ICF Canoe Sprint World Championships medalists in kayak
20th-century Hungarian people